Naria ocellata, common name the ocellate cowry,  is a species of sea snail, a cowry, a marine gastropod mollusk in the family Cypraeidae, the cowries.

Description
They are oval and have a medium thickness. The dorsum surface of these smooth and shiny shells has generally a fawn or cream color and it is spread with numerous white spots, a few of them with a black centre (hence the Latin name ocellata meaning "eyed"). The base is whitish and often has a brown blotch, while the pronounced margins show various fawn spots on a pale background. In the living cowries mantle and foot are  well developed.

Distribution
This species occurs in the northern Indian Ocean (see range map) on the coasts of Mozambique, Persian Gulf, Gulf of Oman, southern India, Maldives, Sri Lanka, up to Thailand, southern Java and Melanesia.

Habitat
Naria ocellata lives in tropical and subtropical zones, from shallow intertidal water up to  depth, feeding on algae or coral polyps.

References

 MacNae, W. & M. Kalk (eds) (1958). A natural history of Inhaca Island, Mozambique. Witwatersrand Univ. Press, Johannesburg
 Felix Lorenz 18.02.2004 - Ocellata
 F.A. Schildler – The size of Erosaria Ocellata - November.1 968 - HAWAIIAN SHELL NEWS
 Lorenz F. & Hubert A. - A guide to worldwide cowries. Edition 2. Hackenheim: Conchbooks. 584 pp

External links
 Gastropods.com : Naria ocellata : photos
 Flmnh
 WoRMS

Cypraeidae
Gastropods described in 1758
Taxa named by Carl Linnaeus